The Indiana University School of Liberal Arts is the home of the humanities and social sciences at Indiana University-Purdue University Indianapolis (IUPUI), an urban, research campus. The only liberal arts school in the Indiana University system, the School of Liberal Arts has 11 departments (Anthropology, Communication Studies, Economics, English, Geography, History, Philosophy, Political Science, Religious Studies, Sociology, and World Languages & Cultures), 16 undergraduate degree programs (including those offered in departmental disciplines as well as American Sign Language/English Interpreting, International Studies, Philanthropic Studies and the Individualized Major Program), and 15 graduate degrees and certificates including Ph.D.s in Economics and Philanthropic Studies. The School of Liberal Arts also houses multiple centers for research and study, some nationally and internationally renowned.

History
The origins of the Indiana University (IU) School of Liberal Arts at IUPUI extend to 1891 when the first class was offered in Indianapolis for credit. That course, in economics, was taught by Indiana University Professor Jeremiah W. Jenks. The course was so successful that IU followed it with classes in history, sociology, and English. The program was modeled after the "extension movement" pioneered in England in the 1860s by Cambridge University.

Deans of the School of Liberal Arts have included Joseph T. Taylor, William M. Plater, John D. Barlow, Herman Saatkamp, Robert W. White, William Blomquist, and Thomas J. Davis.

Profile
The School of Liberal Arts, in its current form, took shape in 1972, three years after the consolidation of Indiana University and Purdue University programs in Indianapolis as IUPUI. Today, the School of Liberal Arts has more than 230 full-time faculty. In the School of Liberal Arts, there are approximately 2200 undergraduate students and 300 graduate students. Between 2010 and 2014, Liberal Arts faculty received $27,755,795 in external grants and contracts.

Academic program
Hallmarks of the School of Liberal Arts are an emphasis on the undergraduate experience, graduate programs with an applied focus, innovative and creative class offerings and degree programs, small class size and flexible schedules, and the combination of theory with practical application.

Liberal Arts Departments, Programs, and Centers

Departments

Department of Anthropology
 Department of Communication Studies
 Department of Economics
 Department of English
 Department of Geography
 Department of History
 Department of Journalism and Public Relations
 Department of Philosophy
 Department of Political Science
 Department of Religious Studies
 Department of Sociology
 Department of World Languages and Cultures

Centers and projects

 Center for Economic Education
 Geography Educators Network of Indiana
 Indiana Center for Intercultural Communication (ICIC)
 Institute for American Thought
 Frederick Douglass Papers
 Peirce Edition Project
 Santayana Edition
 Max Kade German-American Center
 Center for Ray Bradbury Studies
 Josiah Royce Edition
 National Council on Public History
 The Polis Center
 Spanish Resource Center
 Center for the Study of Religion and American Culture
 Writing Center

Undergraduate programs

 Africana Studies (B.A.)
 American Sign Language/English Interpreting (Cert./B.S.)
 Anthropology (B.A.)
 Communication Studies (B.A.)
 Economics (B.A.)
 English (B.A.)
 French (B.A.)
 General Studies (B.A.)
 Geographic Information Science (Cert.)
 Geography (B.A.)
 German (B.A.)
 History (B.A.)
 Human Communication in a Mediated World (Cert.)
 Journalism (Cert./B.A.)
 Individualized Major Program (B.A.)
 International Studies (B.A.)
 Latino Studies (Cert.)
 Medical Humanities and Health Studies (B.A.)
 Motorsports Studies (Cert.)
 Museum Studies (Cert.)
 Paralegal Studies (Cert./B.A.)
 Philosophy (B.A.)
 Political Science (B.A.)
 Public Relations (Cert./B.A.)
 Religious Studies (B.A.)
 Sociology (B.A.)
 Spanish (B.A.)
 Theatre and Performance (Cert.)
 Translation Studies (Cert.)

Graduate programs

 Anthropology (M.A.)
 Applied Communication (M.A.)
 Economics (M.A./Ph.D.)
 English (M.A.)
 Geographic Information Science (M.S./Grad Cert.)
 History/Public History (M.A.)
 Health Communication (Ph.D.)
 Museum Studies (M.A./Grad Cert.)
 Philanthropic Studies (M.A./Ph.D.)
 Philosophy (M.A./Grad Cert.)
 Political Science (M.A.)
 Professional Editing (Grad Cert.)
 Public Relations (M.A.)
 Sociology (M.A.)
 Sports Journalism (M.A.)
 Survey Research (Grad Cert.)
 Teaching English to Speakers of Other Languages (Grad Cert.)
 Teaching Spanish (M.A.T.)
 Teaching Writing (Grad Cert.)

Dual Degrees

 Economics-Philanthropic Studies (MA/MA)
 History-Library Science (MA/MLS)
 History-Philanthropic Studies (MA/MA)
 Philosophy-Law (MA/JD)
 Philosophy-Medicine (MA/MD)

Notes

External links
Indiana University School of Liberal Arts at IUPUI
Indiana University-Purdue University Indianapolis
School Archives
Indiana University

Indiana University–Purdue University Indianapolis
Liberal arts colleges at universities in the United States